Songkran is a term derived from the Sanskrit word,  (or, more specifically) and used to refer to the traditional New Year for Buddhist calendar celebrated in Bangladesh, Thailand, Laos, Cambodia, Myanmar, Sri Lanka, parts of northeast India, parts of Vietnam and Xishuangbanna, China. It begins when the sun transits the constellation of Aries, the first astrological sign in the Zodiac, as reckoned by sidereal astrology. It is related to the equivalent Hindu calendar-based New Year festivals in most parts of South Asia which are collectively referred to as Mesha Sankranti.

Songkran New Year Festivals 
 Cambodian New Year, in Cambodia
 Lao New Year, in Laos 
 Sinhalese New Year, in Sri Lanka
 Songkran (Thailand)
 Thingyan, in Myanmar
 Sangken, in Arunachal Pradesh and parts of Assam, India
 Water-Sprinkling Festival, in Xishuangbanna in China and parts of northern Vietnam.

Festivities outside of Asia

Australia
Songkran celebrations are held in many parts of the country. One of the most notable celebrations is at the Wat Pa Buddharangsee Buddhist Temple in the Sydney suburb of Leumeah, New South Wales. The festival attracts thousands of visitors each year and involves a water fight, daily prayer, dance performances and food stalls which serve food of Thai, Bangladesh (CHT), Burmese, Cambodian, Laotian, Sri Lankan and Malaysian origin. In 2014, the celebration was attended by more than 2000 people. Similarly in the same suburb, the Mahamakut Buddhist Foundation organizes a Songkran celebration featuring chanting, blessing, a short sermon, a fund raising food fete and Southeast Asian traditional dances. Large scale Thai New Year (Songkran) celebrations are held in Thai Town, Sydney in the popular tourist suburb of Haymarket, New South Wales. In Melbourne, the Sinhalese (Sri Lankan) New Year festival is held annually in Dandenong, Victoria. In 2011, it attracted more than 5000 people and claims to be the largest Sinhalese New Year Festival in Melbourne. The Queen Victoria Market held a two-day Songkran event celebrating the Thai New Year in early April 2017. Songkran celebrations celebrating the Thai, Cambodian, Lao, Burmese and Sri Lankan New Year festivals are well known and popular among the residents of the Sydney suburb of Cabramatta, New South Wales which is home to large populations of Cambodians, Laotians and Thais. Temples and organisations hold celebrations across the suburb including a large Lao New Year celebration in the neighbouring suburb of Bonnyrigg organised in partnership with the Fairfield City Council. In the Melbourne suburb of Footscray, Victoria a Lunar New Year celebration initially focusing on the Vietnamese New Year has expanded into a celebration of the Songkran celebrations of the Thais, Cambodians, Laotians and other Asian Australian communities such as Chinese who celebrate the New Year in either January/February or April.  Taronga Zoo in Sydney, New South Wales celebrated the Thai New Year in April 2016 with its Asian elephants and traditional Thai dancers.

United States
Songkran celebrations often occur in cities which host large Sri Lankan, Thai, Burmese, Laotian and Cambodian populations. The UW Khmer Student Association hosts a new year celebration at the University of Washington in Seattle. The White Center Cambodian New Year Street Festival is held at the Golden House Bakery & Deli in Seattle. The Los Angeles Buddhist Vihara in Pasadena, California celebrates the Songkran festival with a focus on the Sri Lankan New Year. The Brahma Vihara in Azusa, California also holds celebrations with a Burmese New Year focus. The International Lao New Year Festival is held annually in San Francisco and celebrates the Lao New Year with acknowledgment of other Asian communities, Thai, Cambodian, Burmese, Sri Lankan and the Dai people of southern China, who also celebrate the same festival. In February 2015, the Freer and Sackler gallery in Washington D.C. held a Lunar New Year event celebrating the "Year of the Sheep" which also celebrated the Lunar New Year that occurs in mid-April for many other Asian countries. It included activities, information and food from China, Korea, Mongolia, Sri Lanka and other Asian countries that celebrated either of the two new year celebrations. Similarly in 2016, The Wing in Seattle held a Lunar New Year celebration centered around the East Asian Lunar New Year however also focused on New Year customs in Laos as part of its "New Years All Year Round" exhibit.

Notes

See also
 South and Southeast Asian New Year
 List of Buddhist festivals
 Mesha Sankranti, the term used to refer to the related Hindu calendar-based New Year festivals of April
 Water Festival, a tradition practiced during certain Songkran celebrations
 Thai calendar

References

New Year celebrations
Buddhist holidays
Buddhist festivals
Sanskrit words and phrases
Festivals in Cambodia
Festivals in Laos
Festivals in Myanmar
Festivals in Sri Lanka
Festivals in Thailand
Festivals in India
Festivals in Vietnam
Festivals in China
Religious festivals in Cambodia
April observances